Deerfield Academy is led by a Head of School selected by the Board of Trustees. During the Academy's history, the position has been known as Preceptor (1799-1851), Principal (1851-1902), Headmaster (1902-2006), and Head of School (2006-).

References

Heads of Deerfield Academy
Heads of American boarding schools
Deerfield, Massachusetts